The University of California public university system is funded through both public and private money.  Some funds are given directly to each of the system's 10 campuses, while the rest are distributed through the central UC Office of the President.  Support given by the state of California to its three-tier higher education system (comprising the University of California, California State University, and California Community College) is presented by the governor every January, and approved by the state legislature at the end of the fiscal year in June. Traditionally, the state of California has been the largest public supporter of the UC system.  In response to state budget woes, UC Berkeley Chancellor Robert Birgeneau in 2011 made the claim that his own university is turning into a federal and not a state institution because of the inversion of the proportion of funds given by each jurisdiction since he became Chancellor in 2004.

Annual budget
Depending upon the source of revenue given to the University of California, funds may either be restricted to certain defined expenditures, or are given to the University for unrestricted use.  Examples of restricted funding include federal research and infrastructure grants, and private support.  Examples of unrestricted funds include student fees (tuition and other fees), state general funds and UC general funds (non-resident tuition, some portions of public contract and grant overhead, some Department of Energy lab fees, patent royalties earned by UC inventions, interest earnings, and application and other fees).

2011-12
The University of California's projected operating revenue for 2011-12 is $22.5B.   The state of California provided 11% of the UC's 2011-12 budget.

Restricted funding
Currently, ~73% of the annual budget of the UC comes from restricted funding sources.  
27% ($5.987B): UC medical centers
19% ($4.312B): Sales, services and auxiliaries funds (these funds include revenue from university cultural centers such as theaters and museums, UC Extension, clinics and other activities)
18% ($3.972B): Government contracts & grants
7% ($1.675B): Private funds
2% ($409M): Other sources

Unrestricted funding
~27% of the UC annual budget comes from unrestricted funding sources.  Unrestricted funding sources support core operations.
11% ($2.374B): State General Funds (39% of core operation funds)
13% ($2.965B): Student fees (48% of core operation funds)
4% ($792M): UC General Funds (13% of core operation funds)

Core operational funds
Core operational funds total $6.131B.  
30%: Academic salaries
23%: Staff salaries
18%: Equipment, utilities and other related expenditures
14%: Employee and retiree benefits
14%: Student financial aid
1%: Senior management salaries

Investments

As of August 2020, the assets under management grew to US$140 billion. These investments include the Endowment, Pension, Retirement savings, and Working capital. The University has divested from fossil fuels as of 2020. The University of California, authorized in 1986 the withdrawal of three billion dollars worth of Divestment from South Africa. Nelson Mandela stated his belief that the University of California's massive divestment was particularly significant in abolishing white-minority rule in South Africa.

See also

California Master Plan for Higher Education

References

Education finance in the United States
University of California